Fairview is an unincorporated community located in Franklin County, Idaho, United States.

References

Unincorporated communities in Franklin County, Idaho
Unincorporated communities in Idaho